George Charles Hunter (2 June 1885 – 20 January 1934) was an English professional footballer who played as a half back in the Football League for Aston Villa, Oldham Athletic, Chelsea and Manchester United.

Career
Born in Nowshera, British India, Hunter played for Aston Villa, Oldham Athletic and Chelsea during his early career. In March 1914, he was sold to Manchester United. He captained the club during the 1914–15 season and stayed with United until January 1915, when his contract was cancelled due to a training ground incident. He played for Croydon Common, Southampton, Brentford and Birmingham as a guest player during the First World War and finished his career with Portsmouth of the Southern League during the 1919–20 season.

Military service
Hunter joined the Queen's Own Royal West Kent Regiment of the British Army in December 1903, rising through the ranks to lance corporal by February 1906. He served in Malta, but was found guilty of theft and receiving stolen goods by court-martial in December 1906 and served 140 days hard labour before being discharged in May 1907.

Over a year after the outbreak of the First World War in August 1914, Hunter enlisted in the Royal Sussex Regiment in September 1915 and served in the 10th (Reserve) Battalion of the regiment until June 1916. He was sent to France to join the 9th (Service) Battalion in August 1916, but bouts of dysentery saw him posted back to Britain as a fitness instructor. He was demobbed after the Armistice with Germany in November 1918.

Personal life
After his retirement from football, Hunter worked as a sports writer.

Career statistics

References

External links
 MUFCInfo.com profile
 AboutManUtd.com profile

1885 births
1934 deaths
English footballers
Manchester United F.C. players
Aston Villa F.C. players
Oldham Athletic A.F.C. players
Chelsea F.C. players
English Football League players
English Football League representative players
Maidstone United F.C. (1897) players
Croydon Common F.C. players
Southampton F.C. wartime guest players
Brentford F.C. wartime guest players
Birmingham City F.C. wartime guest players
Portsmouth F.C. players
British Army personnel of World War I
Queen's Own Royal West Kent Regiment soldiers
Royal Sussex Regiment soldiers
Southern Football League players
Footballers from Jammu and Kashmir
Association football defenders
British Army personnel who were court-martialled
English prisoners and detainees
Prisoners and detainees of the British military
English sportswriters
20th-century English male writers
British people convicted of theft
People from Nowshera District
20th-century English non-fiction writers
Military personnel of British India